Torbehgudeh (also Romanized as Torbehgūdeh; also known as Nazbagūdeh, Torbehkūdeh, and Torobgūdeh) is a village in Licharegi-ye Hasan Rud Rural District, in the Central District of Bandar-e Anzali County, Gilan Province, Iran. At the 2006 census, its population was 299, in 83 families.

References 

Populated places in Bandar-e Anzali County